Frans Wilhelm Odelmark (1849–1937) was a Swedish artist noted for his genre paintings and Orientalist themes.

Life and career

He studied at the Royal Academy of Arts in Stockholm and after that in Düsseldorf and in Munich. He painted people in everyday live and picturesque architectural subjects, mainly with subjects from Europe and the Orient, staying in Egypt for an extended period and where he made many colourful paintings of Cairo. He executed works in watercolor, pastel and oil.

Gallery

See also
 List of Orientalist artists
 Orientalism

References

Nationalencyklopedin online

External links

1849 births
1937 deaths
Orientalist painters